Tariq Anwar may refer to:
Tariq Anwar (politician) (born 1951), Indian politician
Tariq Anwar (film editor) (born 1945), film editor